Allenay is a commune in the Somme department in Hauts-de-France in northern France.

Geography
The commune is situated c. 5 km from the English Channel, on the D19 road and 11 km northeast of Le Tréport on the border of the departments of the Somme and Seine-Maritime.

See also
Communes of the Somme department

References

Communes of Somme (department)